"The Popular Wobbly" is a labor song written by the Finnish-American songwriter T-Bone Slim. It is a parody of the 1917 hit "They Go Wild Simply Wild Over Me" by Joseph McCarthy and Fred Fisher.

"The Popular Wobbly" first appeared in the 1920 edition of the Little Red Songbook published by the Industrial Workers of the World. Its title referred to the "Wobbly" nickname that was often given to IWW members.

The song was revived during the Civil Rights Movement of the 1960s. Candie Carawan wrote new lyrics that told about her 1960 arrest while taking part in desegregation sit-ins in Nashville, Tennessee. The Guy and Candie Carawan version is known as They Go Wild Over Me. An adaptation of "The Popular Wobbly" was also included in a 1931 songbook published by radio personality Ernest Iverson.

Pete Seeger, Utah Phillips and Joe Glazer are among the well-known singers who have performed the song.

References

External links 

Streaming audio
They Go Wild Simply Wild Over Me: Billy Murray
The Popular Wobbly: Utah Phillips
Books
Den Populära Rebellen (The Popular Wobbly) 
The Popular Wobbly and two other T-Bone Slim songs 
Lyrics
The Popular Wobbly:  Swedish translation
The Popular Wobbly: Ernest Iverson adaptation

1920 songs
American songs
Musical parodies
Trade union songs
Songs written by Fred Fisher